Frank J. Marmion, Jr. (April 2, 1917 – February 1, 1997) is a former Republican member of the Pennsylvania House of Representatives.

References

Republican Party members of the Pennsylvania House of Representatives
1997 deaths
1917 births
20th-century American politicians